Korakhai  is a traditional Odia food, mainly served as a prasad in temples. It is a common food in the state of Odisha.Pilgrims offers Korakhai as a form of prasad to lord Lingaraj. It is also a form of caramelized Lia. Khai is also known by the name of Leeaa in western Odisha.

Ingredients
 Khai
 Jaggery or Sugar
 Coconut
 Cardamom

Preparation 
Caramelization:
For caramelization add sugar or jaggery to water and let it melt for 10-15 minutes. Add Coconut pieces and cinnamon to it.
Preparation of Kora:
Add puffed rice to the caramelized solution and make balls for Muan or cut it into pieces for Khai.

See also
Chhena Poda
Rasabali
Rasagolla
Chhena Gaja
Kheersagar
Chhena Kheeri
Chhena jalebi
List of Indian sweets and desserts
Oriya cuisine

References

Odia cuisine
Indian cuisine
Foods containing coconut
Rice dishes